The House at 5011 Sunset Drive is a historic home located in the Country Club District, Kansas City, Missouri. It was designed by architect Mary Rockwell Hook and was built in 1922–1923. It is a three-story, "L"-plan, Bungalow / American Craftsman style stone veneered dwelling with a two-story wing.  It features an overhanging hipped roof with heavily bracketed eaves and an "outdoor living room".

It was listed on the National Register of Historic Places in 1983.

References

Houses on the National Register of Historic Places in Missouri
Bungalow architecture in Missouri
Houses completed in 1923
Houses in Kansas City, Missouri
National Register of Historic Places in Kansas City, Missouri